Girardota is a town and municipality in Antioquia Department, Colombia. Girardota is part of The Metropolitan Area of the Aburrá Valley.

References

Municipalities of Antioquia Department
The Metropolitan Area of the Aburrá Valley